The 14th Hong Kong Awards ceremony, honored the best films of 1994 and took place on 23 April 1995 at Hong Kong Academy for Performing Arts, Wan Chai, Hong Kong. The ceremony was hosted by John Sham and Meg Lam, during the ceremony awards are presented in 17 categories.

Awards
Winners are listed first, highlighted in boldface, and indicated with a double dagger.

The Chinese Opera Film Century Award was a special award presented at the 14th Hong Kong Film Awardsin celebration of 100 years of Chinese opera. The award was dedicated to Cantonese opera actress Yam Kim-fai.

References

External links
 Official website of the Hong Kong Film Awards

1995
1994 film awards
1995 in Hong Kong